Crown Prince Sohyeon (소현세자, 昭顯世子, 5 February 1612 – 21 May 1645) was the first son of King Injo of Joseon Dynasty.

Sohyeon was a hostage in the Manchu court at Shenyang, by the terms of the peace treaty concluded after War in 1636. He moved to Beijing in 1644, and communicated with the Jesuit missionary Johann Adam Schall von Bell there. Sohyeon died not long after his return to Korea in 1645.

Biography
Sohyeon was selected as the crown prince of the Joseon Dynasty in 1625 when his father King Injo took the throne through insurrection in 1623.

In 1627, he married a daughter of Gang Seok-gi (17th-generation descendant of General Gang Gam Chan). During the Second Manchu invasion of Korea in 1636, Sohyeon fled to the Namhan Mountain Fortress with his father King Injo. But when Ganghwa Island was captured by the Manchus, King Injo surrendered to Hong Taiji. Sohyeon voluntarily gave himself up to be a hostage together with his wife and several other Korean officials at Shenyang, the capital of the Qing Dynasty.

During his time as a hostage, Prince Sohyeon tirelessly worked as a mediator between Joseon Korea and Qing China. He put much effort into ensuring that Qing would not engage in hostilities against Korea. He protected his people, such as Kim Sang-heon (1570-1652), who was accused by the Manchus of being an anti-Qing agent. Prince Sohyeon also learned the Mongol language and assisted in the conquest of the Western frontier.

In 1644, Prince Sohyeon stayed 70 days in Beijing with Dorgon, who had set out to conquer the remnants of the Ming Dynasty. There Prince Sohyeon met Jesuit missionaries such as the German Johann Adam Schall von Bell, and through them he was introduced to Roman Catholicism and Western culture.

King Injo and his close administrators condemned Sohyeon's conduct as pro-Qing, and even though Prince Sohyun returned to Korea in 1645, his father King Injo persecuted him for attempting to modernize Korea by bringing in Catholicism and Western science. Prince Sohyeon died suddenly not long after his return to Korea; he was found dead in the King's room, mysteriously bleeding severely from the head. Legends say that Injo killed his own son with an ink slab that the Crown Prince brought from China; however, some historians suggest he was poisoned by the fact that he had black spots all over his body after his death and that his body decomposed rapidly.  Many, including his wife, tried to uncover what happened to the Crown Prince, but Injo ordered immediate burial and reduced the grandeur of the practice of Crown Prince's funeral. Prince Sohyeon’s tomb is located in Goyang, Gyeonggi province.  King Injo never visited his son's tomb.

King Injo appointed Grand Prince Bongrim as new Crown Prince (who later became King Hyojong) rather than Prince Sohyon's oldest son, Prince Gyeongseon.  Soon after, Injo ordered the exile of Prince Sohyun's three sons to Jeju Island (from which only the youngest son, Prince Gyeongan, returned to the mainland alive), and the execution of Sohyeon's wife, Crown Princess Minhoe, for treason.

Family
Father: Injo of Joseon (7 December 1595 - 17 June 1649) (조선 인조)
Grandfather: Wonjong of Joseon (2 August 1580 - 29 December 1619) (조선 원종)
Grandmother:  Queen Inheon of the Neungseong Gu clan (17 April 1578 - 14 January 1626) (인헌왕후 구씨)
Mother: Queen Inyeol of the Cheongju Han clan (인열왕후 한씨)
Grandfather: Han Jun-gyeom (1557 - 1627) (한준겸) 
Grandmother: Lady Hwang of the Changwon Hwang clan (1561 - 1594) (창원 황씨)
Sibling(s):
Younger brother: Yi Ho, Grand Prince Bongrim (1619 - 1659) (이호 봉림대군)
Sister-in-law: Princess Consort Pungan of the Deoksu Jang clan (9 February 1619 - 19 March 1674) (풍안부부인 장씨)
Younger brother: Yi Yo, Grand Prince Inpyeong (10 December 1622 - 13 May 1658) (이요 인평대군)
Sister-in-law: Princess Consort Bokcheon of the Dongbok Oh clan (22 April 1622 - 6 August 1658) (복천부부인 동복 오씨)
Younger brother: Yi Gon, Grand Prince Yongseong (24 October 1624 - 22 December 1629) (이곤 용성대군)
Consort and their respective issue(s):
Crown Princess Minhoe of the Geumcheon Gang clan (1611 – 1646)
Unnamed Princess (1629 - 1631) – 1st Daughter
Unnamed Princess (1631 - 1640) – 2nd Daughter
Yi Seok-cheol, Prince Gyeongseon (1636 - 1648) – 1st Son
Princess Gyeongsuk (1637 - 1655) – 3rd Daughter
Yi Seok-rin, Prince Gyeongwan (1640 - 1648) – 2nd Son
Princess Gyeongnyeong (1642 - 1682) – 4th Daughter
Yi Seok-gyeon, Prince Gyeongan (1644 - 1665) – 3rd Son
Princess Gyeongsun (1643 - 1654) – 5th Daughter

In popular culture
Portrayed by Baek Yoon-sik in the 1981 KBS1 TV Series Daemyeong.
Portrayed by Kim Ji-wan in the 2008 SBS TV Series Iljimae.
Portrayed by Im Ho in the 2008 KBS2 TV series Strongest Chil Woo.
Portrayed by So Young-don in the 2009 MBC TV series Tamra, the Island.
Portrayed by Kang Sung-min in the 2010 KBS2 TV series The Slave Hunters.
Portrayed by Jung Gyu-woon in the 2012 MBC TV series Horse Doctor.
Portrayed by Jung Sung-woon in the 2013 JTBC TV series Blooded Palace: The War of Flowers.
Portrayed by Lee Jin-wook in the 2014 tvN TV series The Three Musketeers.
Portrayed by Baek Sung-hyun in the 2015 MBC TV series Splendid Politics.
Portrayed by Shin Ki-joon in the 2017 film The Fortress and 2015 MBC TV series Splendid Politics.
Mentioned in the 2020 SBS TV series The King: Eternal Monarch. Crown Prince Sohyeon, in a parallel universe, lived on to become king. His reign would cause a chain reaction that culminated in a modern constitutional monarchy.
Portrayed by Lee Joon-hyuk in the 2021 tvN TV series Secret Royal Inspector & Joy.
 Portrayed by Kim Sung-cheol in the 2022 film The Night Owl.

Notes

1612 births
1645 deaths
17th-century Korean people
House of Yi
Korean princes
Heirs apparent who never acceded